Brick Dudley Smith (born May 2, 1959) is an American former Major League Baseball first baseman who played for the Seattle Mariners in 1987 and 1988. 

A native of Charlotte, North Carolina, Smith played college baseball for Wake Forest University. In 1979 and 1980, he played collegiate summer baseball with the Hyannis Mets of the Cape Cod Baseball League, helping lead the team to the league championship in 1979, and winning the league's Sportsmanship Award and Thurman Munson Award for Batting Champion the following season.

Drafted by the Seattle Mariners in the 5th round of the 1981 Major League Baseball draft, Smith made his MLB debut with the Mariners on September 13, 1987 and appeared in his final MLB game on April 23, 1988.

References

External links
, or Retrosheet, or Pelota Binaria (Venezuelan Winter League)

1959 births
Living people
American expatriate baseball players in Canada
Bakersfield Mariners players
Baseball players from Charlotte, North Carolina
Bellingham Mariners players
Calgary Cannons players
Cardenales de Lara players
American expatriate baseball players in Venezuela
Chattanooga Lookouts players
Hyannis Harbor Hawks players
Indianapolis Indians players
Major League Baseball first basemen
Seattle Mariners players
Tucson Toros players
Wake Forest Demon Deacons baseball players